Wilson T. Nesbitt (1781May 13, 1861) was a United States representative from South Carolina. Born in 1781, his exact date of birth is unknown, but he resided in Spartanburg, South Carolina where he attended the common schools. Later, he was a student at South Carolina College (now the University of South Carolina) at Columbia, South Carolina in 1805 and 1806. He engaged in agricultural pursuits and conducted an iron foundry.

Nesbitt was a justice of quorum of Spartanburg County, South Carolina in 1810. He served as a member of the South Carolina House of Representatives, 1810–1814. He was elected as a Democratic-Republican to the Fifteenth Congress (March 4, 1817 – March 3, 1819). After leaving Congress, he moved to Alabama. He died in Montgomery, Alabama in 1861 (shortly after Alabama had declared itself as part of the Confederate States of America) and was buried in Oakwood Cemetery.

References

1781 births
1861 deaths
Democratic-Republican Party members of the United States House of Representatives from South Carolina
19th-century American politicians